Clematis cunninghamii (In Māori: Akangākaukiore) is one of seven species of clematis that is native to New Zealand. C. cunninghamii is regularly found throughout the North Island.

Clematis cunninghamii grows in lowland forests and forest margins. Produces white flowers between September and November, and fruits from November to January. Seeds are dispersed by wind.

References

cunninghamii
Flora of New Zealand
Plants described in 1863
Taxa named by Nikolai Turczaninow